Road signs in Israel are decided by the Ministry of Transportation in the Division of Transportation Planning, most recently set forth in June 2011.

They generally use the same pattern of colors, shapes, and symbols as set out in the Vienna Convention on Road Signs and Signals, used also in most countries of Europe and the Middle East.

Language
Signs employ three scripts – Hebrew, Arabic, and Latin – and are written in Hebrew and Arabic, the two official languages of the country, and in English.

The stop sign, however, instead of displaying words in three languages, or even just in English as required by the Vienna Convention on Road Traffic, conveys its meaning through the depiction of a raised hand.

Font
Israeli road sign regulations provide for the following fonts to be used: Tamrurim for Hebrew script, Medina for Arabic script, and Triumvirat (a Helvetica derivative) for Latin script as well as numbers. However, these rules are not consistently followed; some signs use Highway Gothic (used for all road signs in the United States) for the Latin script.

Signs giving warnings
Signs warning of hazardous conditions or dangerous situations (e.g. "Intersection" or "Steep incline ahead" bear a black-on-white symbol inside a red-bordered triangle (point uppermost).

Signs giving orders
With the exception of the special shapes used for "Stop" and "Yield" signs (respectively, an octagon and a downward-pointing triangle), signs giving orders are circular and are of two kinds:

 Mandatory signs (e.g. "Turn right only") bear a white symbol on a blue disk.
 Prohibitory signs (e.g. "No left turn") take the form of a black-on-white symbol inside a red-bordered circle, sometimes with the addition of a red slash through the symbol.

Signs giving information
Signs giving information are generally rectangular (sometimes pointed at one end in the case of direction signage).

Highways in Israel are classified as:

 National (single-digit number)
 Inter-city (two digits)
 Regional (three digits)
 Local (four digits)

Route-marker signs are also color-coded:

 Freeways (Blue)
 Expressways (Red)
 Regional routes (Green)
 Local roads (Black, formerly Brown)

Most directional signs to towns and cities are:

 white-on-blue (freeways)
 white-on-green (other main roads)
 black-on-white (local destinations)
 white-on-brown (tourist destinations: landmarks, historical sites, nature reserves, etc.).

The sign for permitted parking features a white-on-blue "P" for "parking" enclosed by the Hebrew letter Het ("ח") for "hanaya", which also means "parking").

The sign informing users that they are on a priority road is a white-edged yellow "diamond" (i.e. a square turned through 45°).

References

External links
 

Israel
Road transport in Israel